Kalateh-ye Sanjar (also Romanized as Kalāteh-ye Sanjar, Kalāteh-i-Sanjar, and Kalāteh Sanjar) is a village in Azari Rural District, in the Central District of Esfarayen County, North Khorasan Province, Iran. At the 2006 census, its population was 494, in 121 families.

References 

Populated places in Esfarayen County